Höpt is a hops-flavored soda line. Fruit flavored hops sodas including pear are offered.

References

Drink brands
Carbonated drinks
New Zealand drinks